Cape Spirit is the easternmost point of Black Island, in the Ross Archipelago. Cape Spirit was visited by the New Zealand Geological Survey Antarctic Expedition (NZGSAE) (1958–59) and so named by them because of the almost constant and spirited winds blowing through the strait between Black and White Islands.

Headlands of the Ross Dependency
Black Island (Ross Archipelago)